KKMR (106.5 FM) is a radio station licensed to serve Arizona City, Arizona, United States. is a radio station broadcasting out of Phoenix, Arizona and serving the Phoenix metropolitan area. It is owned by Educational Media Foundation.

The station was assigned the KKMR call letters by the U.S. Federal Communications Commission (FCC) on February 13, 2002.

History
KKMR signed on in 1986 as KXMK at 106.3. It has spent most of its life simulcasting other stations, especially former co-channel station KOMR. The stations formerly held a classical music format in the early 1990s, with this station bearing the KONZ calls, and later it shared KEDJ's Modern Rock format. In 1997 it switched frequencies and began its ill-fated stints as a Triple-A and an oldies outlet before returning to simulcasting KEDJ in 1999.

In 2001 Univision (when it was Hispanic Broadcasting Corporation) acquired the station and changed it to a Spanish-language Adult Contemporary station called "Amor" as a simulcast with KOMR and KQMR. In October 2005, Univision made adjustments to the "Amor" format making it more Oldies-driven, and changed the name to "Recuerdo".

The station applied for an FCC construction permit in 2000 for a power increase to class C3. It was granted in 2010 after much modification and application tweaking. This was overseen by the Hispanic Broadcasting Corp. engineering department, which more or less specialized in upgrades (such as KESS-FM Dallas, KAMA-FM Houston, and WADO (AM) New York). The permit expired on January 15, 2013.

In June 2017, Univision agreed to sell KKMR for $500,000 to the Educational Media Foundation, which would convert it to noncommercial operation in the Air1 network. The sale was completed on November 16, 2017.

In 2019, Educational Media Foundation changed KKMR from Air1 to K-Love as part of a major switch of transmitters between the networks in central Arizona.

References

External links

Mass media in Pinal County, Arizona
Contemporary Christian radio stations in the United States
K-Love radio stations
Educational Media Foundation radio stations
KMR